In medicine, histiocytosis is an excessive number of histiocytes (tissue macrophages), and the term is also often used to refer to a group of rare diseases which share this sign as a characteristic.  Occasionally and confusingly, the term "histiocytosis" is sometimes used to refer to individual diseases.

According to the Histiocytosis Association of America, 1 in 200,000 children in the United States are born with histiocytosis each year. HAA also states that most of the people diagnosed with histiocytosis are children under the age of 10, although the disease can afflict adults. The disease usually occurs from birth to age 15.

Histiocytosis (and malignant histiocytosis) are both important in veterinary as well as human pathology.

Diagnosis

 
Histiocytosis is a rare disease, thus its diagnosis may be challenging. A variety of tests may be used, including:

 Imaging
 CT scans of various organs such as lung, heart and kidneys.
 MRI of the brain, pituitary gland, heart, among other organs. 
 Skeletal survey is useful in children
 Ultrasound of liver and spleen
 Blood tests: measure cell counts and inflammation
 Breathing tests
 Tissue biopsy and molecular testing to detect mutations

Classification
There are competing systems for classifying histiocytoses. According to the 1999 classification proposed by the World Health Organization, they can be divided into three categories. However, the classifications in ICD10 and MeSH are slightly different, as shown below:

Alternatively, histiocytoses may be divided into the following groups:
 X-type histiocytoses
 Non-X histiocytoses

Lymphohistiocytosis is a similar immune system disease characterized by the inappropriate activation of natural killer cells, CD8+ cytotoxic T-cells, and macrophages, involving principally the liver, spleen and central nervous system and associated with severe lymphoid atrophy.

Treatments
Various treatments exist for histiocytosis. The one selected depends on the location of the disease and the patient history. The modalities use may include:
 Chemotherapy
 Cladribine (also known as 2CDA or Leustatin)
 Etoposide
 Methotrexate
 6-mercaptopurine
 Vinblastine
 Surgery
 Radiation therapy

Society
Patients and families can gain support and educational materials from the Histiocytosis Association

The Histiocyte Society, a nonprofit organization, is a group of more than 200 physicians and scientists from around the world committed to improving the lives of patients with histiocytic disorders by conducting clinical and laboratory research into the causes and treatment of this disease. The Society has instituted several clinical trials and treatment plans.

The NACHO is a group of institutions that collaborate on scientific and clinical research for histiocytic diseases. Established in 2014 by 12 institutions, it was funded through a consortium grant from the St. Baldrick's Foundation.

References

External links 

 
Monocyte- and macrophage-related cutaneous conditions